Oxychilus translucidus is a species of gastropods belonging to the family Oxychilidae.

The species is found in Europe.

References

translucidus